The 2010–11 Sporting CP season was the club's 77th season in the top-flight Primeira Liga, known as the Liga Zon Sagres for sponsorship purposes. The club also participated in the UEFA Europa League, which it entered in the third qualifying round.

Players

Squad information

Players in / out

In 

 
 

Total spending:  €12.49 million.

Out

Total income:   €20 million.

Player statistics

Squad stats
 

1 Other Competitions: Pre-season and friendlies

Disciplinary records

Starting players

|-
! colspan="6"| 11 starters
|-

|-
! colspan="6"| Other starters
|-

Club

Current technical staff

Competitions

Overall statistics

Overview

Primeira Liga

League table

Results summary

Results by round

UEFA Europa League

Third qualifying round

Play-off round

Group stage

Group C

Last 32

Results by round

Taça de Portugal

Third qualifying round

Fourth qualifying round

Fifth qualifying round

Portuguese League Cup

Third round
Group D

Competitive

Portuguese Liga

Kickoff times are in UTC.

UEFA Europa League

Kickoff times are in CET.

Third qualifying round

Play-off round

Group stage

Taça de Portugal

Kickoff times are in UTC.

Third qualifying round

Fourth qualifying round

Fifth qualifying round

Taça da Liga

Kickoff times are in UTC.

Third qualifying round

Pre-season

References

External links 
 Official club website 

2011
Portuguese football clubs 2010–11 season
2010–11 UEFA Europa League participants seasons